"I Wish the Phone Would Ring" is the title of a 1992 song by the American girl group Exposé. The song was written by Michael Margules (also known as "Michael Jay") and Marvin Morrow, and it appears on Exposé's self-titled 1992 album.
The single is a mid-tempo dance-pop tune that lyrically describes how the singers desire to hear their lovers call them on the telephone in order to patch up their differences.

Lead vocals on the song were performed by Jeanette Jurado. In addition to veteran members Jurado and Ann Curless, this was the first single released by Exposé to feature Kelly Moneymaker as a member of the group, since Gioia Bruno had departed in 1991 due to the discovery of a benign throat tumor.

Reception 
Released as the first single from the album in September 1992, "I Wish the Phone Would Ring" became the group's ninth Top 40 hit on the Billboard Hot 100, reaching #28 on the chart in December of that year. Although the song missed the Billboard Hot Dance Club Play chart, the 12" single did reach #14 on the magazine's Hot Dance Singles Sales chart.

Music video 
The music video for "I Wish the Phone Would Ring" shows the members of the group wearing black shirts and blue jeans dancing and lip-syncing to the song. Interspersed with this are scenes of couples missing each other's phone messages, until the end of the video when the couples are able to connect. The official video was directed by Millicent Shelton.

Track listing

U.S. CD Maxi-single
 "I Wish the Phone Would Ring" album version (4:06)
 "I Wish the Phone Would Ring" remix (6:18)
 "I Wish the Phone Would Ring" Exposed Mix (5:03)
 "I Wish the Phone Would Ring" Dub House Mix (6:57)
 "I'll Never Get Over You Getting Over Me" (3:49)

U.S. 12" single
A1 - "I Wish the Phone Would Ring" remix (6:18)
A2 - "I Wish the Phone Would Ring" Exposed Mix (5:03)
B1 - "I Wish the Phone Would Ring" Dub House Mix (6:49)
B2 - "I Wish the Phone Would Ring" album version (4:06)
B3 - "I Wish the Phone Would Ring" acapella (3:21)

Charts

References

External links
12" single info from discogs.com

1992 singles
Exposé (group) songs
1992 songs
Arista Records singles
Songs written by Marvin Morrow
Songs written by Michael Margules